The United States Eye Injury Registry is an American national database of eye injuries.

External links
Official website

Vision